Benedetto Luti (17 November 1666 – 17 June 1724) was an Italian painter.

Early life
Luti was born in Florence on 17 November 1666.

Career
In 1691, he moved to Rome, where he was patronized by Cosimo III de' Medici, Grand Duke of Tuscany, an enthusiast of Luti's pastel portraiture. Luti was one of the first artists to work in pastels as the final composition as opposed to initial studies for paintings or frescoes. He also worked in oils and painted frescoes, including for the Basilica di San Giovanni in Laterano.

Luti was also a successful art dealer and ran a school of drawing; among his pupils were Giovanni Domenico Piastrini, Giovanni Paolo Panini, Claude Arnulphy, Jean-Baptiste van Loo, William Kent, Charles-André van Loo, Gaetano Sardi, Agostino Ratti, Pietro Bianchi, Placido Costanzi, and Vieira Lusitano.

Knighting
In 1720, he was knighted in the Academy of St Luke of Rome and elected Principe. The appointment was not without controversy, since some:
"could not find anything (of Luti's) worthy of memory for the benefit of the arts. Pascoli's of account Luti, found him a deep intellect, and even more knowledgeable of the works that he draws, although ... because he knew too much and was never satisfied, he oftentimes recycled thoughts and figures: he did not make friends with anyone, and for this reason, when was elected Prince of the Academy, there was not much applause."

The next year he dedicated himself to painting frescoes the cupola of the Church of Santi Luca e Martina in Rome.

Gallery

References

 R. Maffeis, Benedetto Luti: l'ultimo maestro, Firenze, Mandragora, 2012.
 S. Sperindei, Nuovi spunti di ricerca su Benedetto Luti, in "Annali della Pontificia Insigne Accademia di Belle Arti e Lettere dei Virtuosi al Pantheon", 14 (2014), pp. 601-612.
 G. Sestieri, Risarcimenti a Benedetto Luti, in Studi di storia dell’arte in onore di Fabrizio Lemme, a cura di F. Baldassari, A. Agresti, Roma 2017,pp. 265–276.

1666 births
1724 deaths
Painters from Florence
Italian Baroque painters
17th-century Italian painters
Italian male painters
18th-century Italian painters
18th-century Italian male artists